Seán Browne (3 May 1916 – 27 March 1996) was an Irish Fianna Fáil politician. He was a Teachta Dála (TD) for the Wexford constituency – first elected in 1957.

Early and personal life
Browne was a prominent member of the GAA. He served as chairman of Wexford County Board for 21 years.

Seán Browne was the uncle of John Browne, a TD representing the Wexford constituency from 1982 to 2016.

Political career
Browne was elected to Dáil Éireann as a Fianna Fáil TD for the Wexford constituency at the 1957 general election. He was defeated at the 1961 election, and was unsuccessful again at the 1965 general election. However, after his 1961 defeat he was elected to the 10th Seanad on the Labour Panel, which returned him in 1965 to the 11th Seanad.

Browne regained his Dáil seat at the 1969 general election. He was re-elected to the Dáil in 1973 and 1977, but was defeated at the 1981 general election. He was re-elected at the February 1982 election, but when the 23rd Dáil was dissolved later that year, he did not contest the November 1982 election and was succeeded by his nephew John Browne.

He also served as Leas-Cheann Comhairle of the Dáil from 1977 to 1981.

References

1916 births
1996 deaths
Members of the 16th Dáil
Members of the 10th Seanad
Members of the 11th Seanad
Members of the 19th Dáil
Members of the 20th Dáil
Members of the 21st Dáil
Members of the 23rd Dáil
Fianna Fáil TDs
Politicians from County Wexford
Fianna Fáil senators